Castro Daire is a municipality in Viseu District in Portugal. The population in 2011 was 15,339, in an area of 379.04 km2.

The present mayor is Paulo Almeida , elected by a coalition CDS-PP, PSD. The municipal holiday is June 29 (St Peter's Day).

Climate

Demographics

Parishes
Administratively, the municipality is divided into 12 civil parishes (freguesias):

 Almofala
 Cabril
 Castro Daire
 Cujó
 Gosende
 Mamouros, Alva e Ribolhos
 Mezio e Moura Morta
 Mões
 Moledo
 Monteiras
 Parada de Ester e Ester
 Pepim
 Picão e Ermida
 Pinheiro
 Reriz e Gafanhão
 São Joaninho

Notable people 
 Isaac Aboab da Fonseca (1605–1693) a rabbi, scholar, kabbalist and writer.

Sport 
 Vítor Manuel da Silva Marques (born 1969), known as Vitinha a futsal player and captain of the Portugal national futsal team 
 Luís Carlos (born 1972) a former footballer with 140 club caps
 Ricardo Ferreira (born 1982) a footballer with 124 caps with Académico de Viseu
 Luís Carlos Pereira Carneiro (born 1988), known as Licá, a footballer with over 330 club caps

References

External links
Town Hall official website
Photos from Castro Daire

Populated places in Viseu District
Municipalities of Viseu District